The Waterloo-St. Jacobs Railway (WSJR) was a heritage railway west of Toronto that ran between Waterloo and St. Jacobs, Ontario from 1997 to 1999.

The railway used two diesel locomotives built in the 1950s, originally owned by Canadian National Railways, and repainted them in their original paint scheme. The locomotives were named Spirit of St. Jacobs and Pride of Waterloo. It also had several passenger cars painted in the same paint scheme.

Excursions had three stops, and visitors could board on a later train. The Railway allowed visitors to see farms of the Old Order Mennonites and visit the village of St. Jacobs.

The railway ceased operation in 2000 due to maintenance costs. In late 2006, the two diesels and three passenger cars were purchased by the West Coast Railway Association. However,  the diesels and one passenger car remain in Via Rail's Mimico maintenance yard.

Waterloo Central Railway

In May 2007, the Southern Ontario Locomotive Restoration Society received approval from the City of Waterloo to launch a new Waterloo-St. Jacobs tourist train service. The new railway became the Waterloo Central Railway.

Waterloo Central Railway began operations in June 2007. It operates a seasonal schedule, Tuesdays, Thursdays and Saturdays between Waterloo, the St. Jacobs Farmers' Market and the community of St. Jacobs. In 2015, as a result of Ion rapid transit project, the Waterloo Central Railway no longer departs from the station located at 10 Father David Bauer Drive but now departs from a station at the St. Jacobs Farmers' Market..

See also

 Waterloo Central Railway
 Ion rapid transit
 Waterloo Junction Railway
 List of Ontario railways
 List of heritage railways in Canada
 List of defunct Canadian railways

References

External links

Waterloo Central Railway

Heritage railways in Ontario
Passenger rail transport in Waterloo, Ontario
Rail transport in Woolwich, Ontario
Defunct Ontario railways